Clifford Wallace (Red) Beck (1907 – December 8, 1985) was an American politician in the state of Washington. He served in the Washington House of Representatives for the 26th district from 1961 to 1975 and in the Senate from 1974 to 1979.

References

1985 deaths
1908 births
Politicians from Bloomington, Indiana
Democratic Party members of the Washington House of Representatives
20th-century American politicians
Democratic Party Washington (state) state senators